Ornithoctona are genus of biting flies in the family of louse flies, Hippoboscidae. There are 12 known species. All species are parasites of birds.

Distribution
Ornithoctona are found worldwide with the exception of Antarctica.

Systematics
Genus Ornithoctona Speiser, 1902
Species group '1'
Ornithoctona australaisiae (Fabricius, 1805)
Ornithoctona fusciventris Wiedemann, 1830
Ornithoctona hulahula Maa, 1969
Ornithoctona idonea Falcoz, 1929
Ornithoctona laticornis (Macquart, 1935)
Ornithoctona oxycera Falcoz, 1929
Ornithoctona soror Ferris, 1926
Species group '2'
Ornithoctona nitens Bigot, 1885
Ornithoctona orizabae Bequaert, 1954
Species group '3'
Ornithoctona erythrocephala (Leach, 1817)
Species group '4'
Ornithoctona plicata von Olfers, 1816
Ornithoctona rugicornis Maa, 1963

References

Parasites of birds
Hippoboscidae
Hippoboscoidea genera
Taxa named by Paul Gustav Eduard Speiser